Mareze Joubert (born 18 August 1973) is a South African former professional tennis player.

Tennis career
Joubert began competing on the professional tour in the early 1990s. She reached a best singles ranking of 245 in the world and qualified for two WTA Tour main draws, at the Japan Open and Birmingham Classic in 1994. During her career, she won a total of 18 titles on the ITF Circuit, three in singles and 15 in doubles.

In 2001, she was called up to South Africa's Fed Cup team for a tie against Slovenia in Spain as a last minute replacement for Jessica Steck, who was unable to secure a visa. Playing club tennis in the Netherlands at the time, Joubert made the trip to Spain and featured in the doubles rubber, which she and Kim Grant won against Maja Matevžič and Tina Pisnik.

ITF Circuit finals

Singles: 12 (3 titles, 9 runner-ups)

Doubles: 26 (15 titles, 11 runner-ups)

See also
 List of South Africa Fed Cup team representatives

References

External links
 
 
 

1973 births
Living people
South African female tennis players
White South African people
African Games medalists in tennis
African Games silver medalists for South Africa
Competitors at the 1995 All-Africa Games
20th-century South African women